Rincon Valley Union School District is a public school district in Sonoma County, California, United States. It operates eight elementary schools and two charter middle schools, all in the vicinity of Santa Rosa, California:

Austin Creek Elementary School
Binkley Elementary School
Madrone Elementary School
Sequoia Elementary School
Spring Lake Middle School (Formerly Spring Creek Elementary School)
Spring Creek Matanzas School: Matanzas Campus (4–6)
Village Elementary School
Whited Elementary School
Rincon Valley Charter School: Matanzas Campus
Rincon Valley Charter School: Sequoia Campus

The Rincon Valley Charter School for 7th and 8th grade students has two campuses, one on the same campus as Matanzas Elementary School and one on the same campus as Sequoia Elementary School.

In 2004 the district's $23.9 million ($ when adjusted for inflation) bond proposal was approved by voters.

References

External links
 

School districts in Sonoma County, California